Y100 or Y-100 may refer to:
 Yttrium-100 (Y-100 or 100Y), an isotope of yttrium

Radio stations branded "Y100"
 KCYY in San Antonio, Texas
 WHYI in Miami, Florida
 WNCY in Green Bay, Wisconsin
 WPLY, former station in Philadelphia, Pennsylvania
 WXYY, former station in Rincon, Georgia
 WZJZ in Ft. Myers, Florida